Socialphobia is a 2015 South Korean thriller/drama film starring Byun Yo-han, Lee Joo-seung, and Ryu Jun-yeol. It was co-written and directed by Hong Seok-jae in his directorial debut, based on a real-life story that explores the social issues within internet culture among the Korean youth of the 21st century.

Plot 
A group of youngsters investigate a girl who died after being targeted in a witch-hunt on social networking sites, in an attempt to determine whether her death was suicide or murder. A member of the group at first becomes suspect but later the death was proven as a suicide. The film explores internet addiction, cyber bullying, social phobia and lack of morale - self-esteem among youngsters.

Cast

Main
Byun Yo-han as Ji-woong
Lee Joo-seung as Yong-min
Ryu Jun-yeol as Yang-ge

Supporting
 as Ha-young/Re-na 
Yoo Dae-hyeong as Byung-moo 
 as Moon-hyuk
Jung Jae-woo as Gi-seop 
Jeon Shin-hwan as Jang Se-min 
Lee Kang-wook 이강욱 as Hyung-joo 
Byun Jin-soo as Jin-goo 
Oh Hee-joon as Soldier
Bae Yoo-ram as Jung-bae

Awards and nominations

References

External links 
 
 
 

South Korean mystery films
South Korean thriller films
2015 films
CJ Entertainment films
Films about the Internet
Films about social media
Films about suicide
2010s South Korean films